Alice Mae Lee Jemison (1901–1964) was a Seneca political activist and journalist.  She was a major critic of the Bureau of Indian Affairs (BIA) and the New Deal policies of its commissioner John Collier.  She lobbied in support of California, Cherokee, and Sioux Indians during her career, supported by the Seneca Tribal Council.  Her work was condemned by the Franklin D. Roosevelt administration and she was described harshly in press conferences and before Congressional committees, and for a time she was put under FBI surveillance.

Personal life
Jemison was born on October 9, 1901, in Silver Creek, New York, near the Cattaraugus Reservation.  Her mother, Elnora E. Seneca, was from a prominent Seneca family, and her father, Daniel A. Lee, was "a cabinetmaker of Cherokee descent."  Her goal was to become an attorney and she worked in the office of Robert Codd Jr., but could not afford law school. In 1919, she graduated from Silver Lake High School and was married to Le Verne Leonard Jamison; they were separated nine years later because of his chronic alcoholism. She financially supported her mother and her two children. In addition to her careers in journalism and activism, she worked at various times as a beautician, salesperson, factory worker, clerk, peddler, dressmaker, and theater usher. She also mothered Jeanne Marie Jemison, who became a judge in the Seneca Nation.

Early career
In March 1930, Colthilde Marchand, wife of sculptor Henri Marchand, was murdered in Buffalo, and authorities charged two Iroquois women, one of the artist's models, Lila Jimerson and her friend Nancy Bowen with the crime. Jemison supported their defense when the District Attorney, Guy Moore, called it an "Indian" crime and conducted warrantless searches of Seneca and Cayuga homes. She worked with Chief Clinton Rickard and Seneca President Ray Jimerson to appeal to political leaders, including U.S. Vice President Charles Curtis. Because of their efforts, the Bureau of Indian Affairs arranged for the U.S. Attorney to help represent the defendants.

Jemison worked part time for Seneca President Ray Jimerson in the early 1930s and also wrote for the Buffalo Evening News. Her articles were syndicated by the North American Newspaper Alliance.

In 1931, she was the spokesperson for the Seneca when they rejected an offer from New York State officials to settle a longstanding claim on the part of the Cayuga and the Seneca. The settlement would have given the Seneca $75,000 and the Cayuga $247,000 and the right to continue to live on the Seneca reservation.

In the early 1930s she conducted legal research, wrote newspaper articles, campaigned for the Six Nations' candidate, and lobbied against the Indian Reorganization Act.

Jemison moved to Washington, DC, in 1943 and began writing for the Washington Star.

Lobbying against New Deal policies and the Bureau of Indian Affairs
Jemison's attacks on BIA Commissioner John Collier centered on his ideas about how the Indians should govern themselves. She fought for a diversity of Indian lifestyles, fighting against a monolithic, romantic notion of primitives living on the pueblo. Her ideas were influenced by the writings of Carlos Montezuma and Montezuma's one-time secretary, Joseph W. Latimer.

In May 1933, she responded to criticism from the Indian Rights Association by herself criticizing Collier's appointments of Indian Commissioner Rhoades and Assistant Commissioner Scattergood without holding a hearing and without allowing Indian representatives to testify on their appointments. She said her argument was:

Jemison and her allies viewed the Indian Reorganization Act of 1934 as a violation of treaty rights and a denial of tribal sovereignty. Following this principle, she also fought the federal government's plans to subject the Seneca to the Selective Service Act of 1940 as U.S. citizens, insisting such authority belonged to the Iroquois Confederacy.

Jemison also protested when Roosevelt vetoed the Beiter Bill in June 1935, which would have "restored tribal jurisdiction over fishing and hunting on [Seneca] reservations which had been taken away by the government in the Conservation Act of 1927", which she considered a violation of the Treaty of Canandaigua (1794).

In November 1938, she testified before the Dies Committee, forerunner of the House Un-American Activities Committee, which was investigating Communist influence in labor unions, foreign relief services, and government agencies. On behalf of the American Indian Federation (AIF), she testified that nine officials of the Bureau of Indian Affairs and its parent, the Interior Department, including Interior Secretary Harold Ickes, were members of the American Civil Liberties Union (ACLU), known to the Committee as a Communist front organization. She said the Bureau and the ACLU had engineered the passage of the 1934 act that sought to "restore the Indians to a state of communal bliss with their tribal lands held in common instead of in allotments". Ickes called the Committee's work "a side show" and Dies an "outstanding zany". He gave the press copies of a letter from an anti-Semitic organization, James True Associates, soliciting funds for the AIF. Collier said that the organization Jemison represented was a "trouble-making pro-Nazi racket" trying to engage Indian support nationwide for legislation that would enrich only its own members.

Historians note that Jemison's attacks on the Roosevelt administration, Collier, and the Bureau of Indian Affairs were often unfair or could be described as red-baiting. For example, Jemison claimed that Native Americans were controlled by a group of federal officials "who have well-known regard for radical activities and association with, or admiration for, atheists, anarchists, communists, and other 'fifth columnists'".

Appearing on behalf of the AIF at Congressional hearings in 1940 on the Indian Reorganization Act, six years after its enactment, she said the Bureau of Indian Affairs represented "communism and distinctly Russian in variety" and its plan to compensate Native Americans individually for renouncing land claims "the program of the Christ-mocking, Communist-aiding, subversive and seditious American Civil Liberties Union and its subsidiary, the Progressive Education Association".

When Jemison needed financial support in 1937, she received direct support or payment for reprinting her writings in the publications from several extremist critics of FDR, including the anti-Semites James True and William Dudley Pelley. This later prompted Collier to identify the AIF with Nazi sympathizers.

In January 1939, at a hearing of the Senate Judiciary Committee considering the nomination of Felix Frankfurter to serve on the U.S. Supreme Court, Jemison testified in opposition along with a number of anti-Semitic and nativist witnesses, opponents of the ACLU, and anti-Communist conspiracy theorists. According to The New York Times: 
 
Its report noted this referred to the 1934 Act, which established tribal deeds because the earlier distribution of allotments had "resulted in the Indians selling much of their land to whites".

Other political work
Jemison defended the rights of the Eastern Band of Cherokee Indians along with Cherokee Vice-Chief Fred Bauer, successfully moving the path of the Blue Ridge Parkway to a less disruptive route. Her efforts to defend South Dakota and California Indians increased the voice for diverse Indian opinions before Congress by bringing Native Americans to testify. She also published a newsletter, The First American, which discussed congressional legislation, violation of Indian civil liberties, the image of the American Indian, the abolishment of the Bureau of Indian Affairs, and the removal of Commissioner Collier.

Notes

References

Sources

External links
Photo, "Williams of WPA Assailed by Dies", The New York Times, November 23, 1938

1901 births
1964 deaths
Seneca people
Native American activists
Native Americans' rights activists
20th-century American journalists
American women journalists
20th-century American women
20th-century Native American women
20th-century Native Americans
Native American journalists